Wieldrecht is a small village in the Dutch province of South Holland. It is located about 4 km southwest of the city of Dordrecht, on the Kil River.

Wieldrecht was a separate municipality between 1817 and 1857, when it became part of Dubbeldam.

References

Populated places in South Holland
Former municipalities of South Holland